Patrick Henry Friel (June 11, 1860 – January 15, 1924) was an American professional baseball player.

Friel was born in Lewisburg, West Virginia, and his brother Bill Friel was also a professional baseball player. He began his minor league baseball career in 1883, and continued through the end of the 1896 season. Friel died at the age of 63 in Providence, Rhode Island, and is interred at St. Francis Cemetery in Pawtucket, Rhode Island.

References

External links

1860 births
1924 deaths
Major League Baseball outfielders
Baseball players from West Virginia
Syracuse Stars (AA) players
Philadelphia Athletics (AA 1891) players
19th-century baseball players
People from Lewisburg, West Virginia
Allentown Dukes players
Jersey City Skeeters players
London Tecumsehs (baseball) players
Providence Grays (minor league) players
Springfield Ponies players
Binghamton Bingoes players
Allentown Buffaloes players